Michael Joshua Frank is a neuroscientist who has played a leading role in emerging field of computational psychiatry. He is currently the Edgar L. Marston Professor of Cognitive, Linguistic and Psychological Sciences at Brown University and Director of the Center for Computational Brain Science at Brown's Carney Institute for Brain Science. Other honors include: Kavli Fellow (2016),  the Cognitive Neuroscience Society Young Investigator Award (2011), and the Janet T Spence Award for  early career transformative contributions (Association for Psychological Science, 2010). 

Frank earned a Bachelor of Science in electrical engineering from Queen's University at Kingston in 1997. He received a Master of Science in electrical engineering and doctorate in neuroscience and psychology from the University of Colorado Boulder.

In 2021, Frank received a Troland Research Award from the National Academy of Sciences for his "groundbreaking discoveries in our understanding of learning, valuation, and cognitive control."

References

External links 

  
 online publications / faculty homepage
 Frank lab for neural computation and cognition

Living people
Year of birth missing (living people)
Queen's University at Kingston alumni
University of Colorado Boulder alumni
Brown University faculty